Salma ya salama is a studio album released by French singer Dalida in March 1977. The album was very successful and over two million copies were sold worldwide. To promote the album, Dalida gave several live performances in Europe, the Middle East and in the Arab world. The tour was very successful as well.

Track listing
 "Salma ya salama" (French)
 "Notre façon de vivre"
 "Histoire d'aimer"
 "Tu m'as déclaré l'amour"
 "Mon frère le soleil"
 "Quand s'arrêtent les violons"
 "Ti amo"
 "Remember... c'était loin"
 "À chaque fois j'y crois"
 "Salma ya salama" (Arabic)

Singles
1977: "Histoire d'aimer"
1977: "Remember... C'était loin"
1977: "Salma ya salama"

References

 Dalida official website

External links
 Dalida official website "Discography" section

Dalida albums
1977 albums